Steven Strait (born March 23, 1986) is an American actor and singer. He is best known for starring in the adventure film Sky High (2005) as Warren Peace and the science fiction series The Expanse (2015–2022).

Early life
Strait was born and raised in Greenwich Village, a neighborhood of Manhattan, New York, the son of Jean (née Viscione) and Richard Dyer Strait. His ancestry is Dutch and Italian. He attended Village Community School, Xavier High School and took classes at the Stella Adler Studio of Acting.

Career
During his teen years, Strait modeled for several magazines, including L'uomo Vogue, Spoon magazine, Details, Surface, Hollister Co., and Pop magazine, and worked with photographers Bruce Weber, Herb Ritts, and Ellen von Unwerth.

Strait began taking acting lessons at the age of eleven. In the sixth grade, he began to take performing classes at the Village Community School. Although forced into it at first, he found a passion for acting after he performed live for the first time. He has worked at both the Stella Adler Acting Studio and the Black Nexxus Acting Studio in New York City.

In 2004, he moved to California to pursue a career in acting. After his first audition, he received an acting job, and in 2005, he appeared in his first film, Sky High, where he played a teenage superhero named Warren Peace. He covered The Fixx's song "One Thing Leads to Another" for the film's soundtrack.

His next film starring role was in Undiscovered, about young singers and actors in the entertainment industry who want to become stars. In 2006, he starred as Caleb Danvers in the supernatural thriller film The Covenant, which opened on September 8. Strait appeared opposite Camilla Belle in 10,000 BC, a film about prehistoric Earth, released in March 2008. He played a young mammoth hunter, D'Leh, as he travels through unknown lands on a quest to rescue his people from slavery.

Strait appeared in the 2008 film Stop-Loss as Michael Colson. In 2009, he played Tony, the son of Andy Garcia's character, in the film City Island.

In November 2010, he guest starred on the NBC series Chase as Jackson Cooper, a fugitive with a dark past who manipulates his teenage girlfriend with promises of freedom from her father and a life filled with romance and adventure.

From 2012 to 2013, Strait co-starred on the Starz series Magic City, which centered on Miami mobsters and other characters from Miami Beach in the late 1950s. Strait played the son of Jeffrey Dean Morgan's character, Ike Evans.

In 2012, Strait played Freddy in the sci-fi thriller After. The story centered on two bus crash survivors who wake to discover that they are the only people left in their small town.

In 2014, Strait was cast in the lead role of James "Jim" Holden in the science fiction series The Expanse, which began airing in December 2015 on SyFy. After two seasons, The Expanse began filming the third season on July 12, 2017. The third season aired in 2018 on SyFy; it was to be the show's final season, but due to overwhelming fan support the show was picked up by Amazon for three more seasons.

Music
Strait has signed to Lakeshore Records and is scheduled to record and release a full-length solo album. He also contributed seven songs to the Undiscovered soundtrack.

Personal life
Strait was married to actress Lynn Collins on December 23, 2007. The couple divorced in 2013.

Filmography

References

External links

 

1986 births
Living people
21st-century American male actors
21st-century American singers
American male film actors
Male models from New York (state)
American male television actors
American people of Dutch descent
American people of Italian descent
Male actors from New York City
People from Greenwich Village
Singers from New York City
Xavier High School (New York City) alumni
21st-century American male singers